Benin competed at the 1988 Summer Olympics in Seoul, South Korea.

Competitors
The following is the list of number of competitors in the Games.

Athletics

Men

Women

Judo

Men

References

Official Olympic Reports

Nations at the 1988 Summer Olympics
1988
Olympics